John Varley may refer to: 

 John Varley (canal engineer) (1740–1809), English canal engineer
 John Varley (painter) (1778–1842), English painter and astrologer
 John Varley (author) (born 1947), American science fiction author
 John Silvester Varley (born 1956), former CEO of Barclays Bank
 John Varley (photographer) (1934–2010), British photographer
 John Varley, (Irish: Seán Mac an Bhearlaigh) former Irish Gaelic footballer for and captain of The Neale GAA, in County Mayo. He captained The Neale GAA into winning the Pete McDonnell Cup in 2012 and is sometimes a commentator on Mayo GAA TV.